Rose Grunapfel Meth (November 10, 1925 – October 12, 2013) born as Ruzia Grunapfel, also known as Reisel Grunapfel Meth, was a surviving participant in the October 7, 1944 "Sonderkommando uprising" of inmates in the Auschwitz-Birkenau concentration camp.

Life

Auschwitz Uprising 
Ruzia Grunapfel was born in Zator, Poland. She was sent to Auschwitz in the 1940s where she was forced to work in the Weichsel-Union-Metalwerke or Union Munitions Plant. Ruzia, along with a number of prisoners including Estusia (Ester) Wajcblum, Hanka (Anna) Wajcblum, Regina Safirsztajn, Ala Gertner, Hadassa Zlotnicka, Marta Bindiger, Genia Fischer, and Inge Frank, worked together to sneak the powder out in kerchiefs stuffed into a pocket or their bosom. If searched, they would dump the powder onto the ground and rub it into the earth with their feet. The woman gave the gunpowder to Roza Robota, a prisoner who worked clothing-detail in Birkenau. Robota then gave the gunpowder to the Sonderkommando, a group of death camp prisoners who were forced to dispose of gas chamber victims in the crematoriums.

On October 7, 1944, the Sonderkommandos used the gunpowder to blow up crematorium IV in Birkenau. Ala, Roza, Ester, and Regina were detained and tortured for their role in the plot. The women were publicly hanging in Birkenau on January 5, 1945. Ruzia survived and was forced to watch the executions.
Hanka (Anna) Wajcblum also survived. The fate of the other female prisoners mentioned is unknown. Thirteen days after they died, Auschwitz was closed down by the SS, as they fled from the advance of Russian liberators. 

While in the camp, she traded bread for paper so that she could write notes while in Auschwitz, in order to bear witness later, heeding her father's admonition to remember what happened.  Some of the surviving notes are in the archives at Yad Vashem.

Post World War II 
Grunapfel arrived in the US in 1946 aboard the first civilian ship from Europe since the end of World War II.  Subsequently, she settled in Bensonhurst, Brooklyn, New York, married Irving Meth, and raised three sons.  She spent the last ten years of her life in Kew Gardens Hills, New York.

She died in October 2013.  In 2016 her children and grandchildren dedicated a song in her memory, "Rose Meth, The Unsung Heroine".

References

External links
Bio and testimony of Rose Meth
Rose G. Meth cited in testimony of Anna Heilman
Oral history interview with Rose Meth, United States Holocaust Museum

1925 births
2013 deaths
20th-century Polish Jews
Polish people of World War II
Women in World War II
Auschwitz concentration camp survivors
Polish emigrants to the United States
People from Oświęcim County